Philip-Michaël Devos (born April 26, 1990) is a Canadian professional ice hockey player currently playing for HC Ajoie of the National League (NL).

Career 
Devos played five seasons (2006 – 2011) of major junior hockey in the Quebec Major Junior Hockey League (QMJHL), registering 112 goals, 294 points, and 194 minutes penalty minutes in 325 games played.

On May 26, 2011, the Norfolk Admirals signed Devos on a two-year American Hockey League standard player's contract. He then joined AHL's Syracuse Crunch prior to the 2012-13 season. In October 2013, he was picked up by the Elmira Jackals of the ECHL and was traded to the Florida Everblades in January 2014.

On August 8, 2014, Devos began his European career by signing a one-year contract with Italian club, HC Pustertal Wölfe. Devos went on to finish the season as leading scorer in the Italian Serie A registering 31 goals and 72 assists in 49 games.

On March 23, 2015, Devos continued his European journey by signing a one-year contract with Swiss club, HC Ajoie of the second-tier Swiss League. Serving as an assistant captain, he helped Ajoie win the title in the SL, the second tier of Swiss ice hockey, tallying 17 goals and 68 assists in 63 games of the 2015-16 season which made him the SL leader in points and assists. He signed a new two-year deal with Ajoie in February 2016. On February 12, 2021, Devos agreed early to a 4-year contract extension with HC Ajoie through to the end of the 2024/25 season.

Awards and honours

References

External links

1990 births
Living people
Canadian people of Belgian descent
Bridgeport Sound Tigers players
Elmira Jackals (ECHL) players
Canadian ice hockey right wingers
Florida Everblades players
Gatineau Olympiques players
Norfolk Admirals players
Syracuse Crunch players
Victoriaville Tigres players
Canadian expatriate ice hockey players in the United States